Aoife is an Irish feminine given name. The name is probably derived from the Irish Gaelic aoibh, which means "beauty" or "radiance".
It has been compared to the Gaulish name Esvios (Latinized Esuvius, feminine Esuvia), which may be related to the tribal name Esuvii and the theonym Esus.

Irish mythology 
In Irish mythology, Aífe the daughter of Airdgeimm, sister of Scathach, is a warrior woman beloved of Cuchullain in the Ulster Cycle. T. F. O'Rahilly supposed that the Irish heroine reflects an otherwise unknown goddess representing a feminine counterpart to Gaulish Esus.

Aífe or Aoife was also one of the wives of Lir in the Oidheadh chloinne Lir ("Fate of the Children of Lir"), who turned her stepchildren into swans. There is also Aoife (Áiffe ingen Dealbhaoíth), a woman transformed into a crane, whose skin after death became Manannán's "Crane-bag".

Biblical rendering 
The name is unrelated to the Biblical name Eva, which was rendered as Éabha in Irish, but due to the similarity in sound, Aoife has often been anglicised as Eva or Eve. Aoife MacMurrough (also known as Eva of Leinster) was a 12th-century Irish noblewoman.  The first use of Aoife (that spelling) as a given name in 20th-century Ireland was in 1912.

Given name

People
Aoife Ahern, Dean of Engineering at University College, Dublin
 Aoife Cusack (born 1996), Irish professional wrestler who performs under the ring name Aoife Valkyrie
 Aoife Dooley (born 1991), Irish writer
 Aoife Hoey (born 1983), Irish bobsledding olympian
 Aoife Mannion (born 1995), Irish association footballer
 Aoife McLysaght, Irish scientist
 Aoife Melia, Irish medical doctor
 Aoife Moore, (fl. 2020's), sometimes Aoife-Grace Moore, Northern Irish journalist
 Aoife Mulholland (born 1978), Irish actress
 Aoife Ní Fhearraigh, Irish singer
 Aoife O'Donovan (born 1982), American singer
 Aoife O'Rourke (born 1997), Irish boxer
 Aoife Walsh (born 1989), Irish fashion model

Characters in modern fiction 
 Aoife, sister of Scathach in Michael Scott's series The Secrets of the Immortal Nicholas Flamel
 Main character in The Iron Thorn by Caitlin Kittredge
 Aife, a succubus in Lost Girl
 Aoife Brubeck, daughter of Holly Sykes, the protagonist of The Bone Clocks by David Mitchell
 Aoife Rabbitte, wife of Jimmy Rabbitte, in The Guts by Roddy Doyle
 Aoife Riordan, member of the Riordan family, in Instructions For A Heatwave by Maggie O'Farrell

Other
 Aoife (album) (1996), the second album by the Irish singer Aoife
 The LÉ Aoife (P22) is a Republic of Ireland naval vessel

See also
List of Irish-language given names

References

External links

 Medievalscotland.org

Irish-language feminine given names